The Department of Immigration and Ethnic Affairs was an Australian government department that existed between December 1975 and July 1987.

History
The Department was announced in December 1975, resulting from the abolition of the previous Department of Labor and Immigration. The creation of the Department was an election commitment which Malcolm Fraser said indicated the importance placed by the Fraser Government on Australia's immigration program and the Coalition's concern that issues affecting migrants and their families should receive close and sympathetic attention.

Scope
Information about the department's functions and/or government funding allocation could be found in the Administrative Arrangements Orders, the annual Portfolio Budget Statements and in the Department's annual reports.

According to the Administrative Arrangements Order (AAO) made on 22 December 1975 (reproduced by the National Archives), the Department dealt with:
Migration
Naturalization and aliens

Structure
The Department was an Australian Public Service department, staffed by officials who were responsible to the Minister for Immigration and Ethnic Affairs.

References

Ministries established in 1975
Immigration and Ethnic Affairs
1975 establishments in Australia
1987 disestablishments in Australia